Boyd B. Jones (October 13, 1856 – June 5, 1930) was an American attorney who served as the United States Attorney for the District of Massachusetts from 1897 to 1901. He later served on the faculty at the Boston University School of Law and was one of the founding members of the Sentinels of the Republic.

References

Lawyers from Boston
Boston University alumni
Boston University School of Law faculty
United States Attorneys for the District of Massachusetts
1856 births
1930 deaths